"Actually existing capitalism" or "really existing capitalism" is an ironic term used by critics of capitalism and neoliberalism. The term is used to claim that many economies purportedly practicing capitalism (an economic system characterized by a laissez-faire free-market system) actually have significant state intervention and partnerships between private industry and the state. It is a play on the term actually existing socialism.

The term mixed economy is also used to describe economies with these attributes. The term seeks to point out discrepancy between capitalism as normally defined and what is labelled as capitalism in practice and to claim that (1) capitalism as defined does not and will not exist and (2) actually existing capitalism is undesirable. The term is used as a response to the economic doctrines that have dominated western economic thought throughout the neoliberal period.

Critics point to the use of regulation to avoiding economic problems such as acute commodities fluctuations, financial market crashes, monopolies and extensive environmental damage as examples of how capitalism as defined does not match actually existing capitalist economic systems.

Specifically, the term is primarily directed at the Austrian School or the Chicago school of economics as these are economic schools of thought that strongly advocate for capitalist systems.

See also 
 Keynesian economics
 Saltwater and freshwater economics
 State capitalism

References 

Capitalism
Liberalism
Criticism of capitalism